The 1978 Western Kentucky Hilltoppers football team represented Western Kentucky University in the inaugural 1978 NCAA Division I-AA football season and were led by head coach Jimmy Feix. The NCAA had formed NCAA Division I-AA for football and Western Kentucky, along with the rest of the Ohio Valley Conference (OVC), moved up from Division II to I-AA. The Hilltoppers won the OVC championship, but just missed the NCAA Division I-AA playoffs. The team finished the season tied for fourth in final national NCAA poll. 

Western Kentucky's roster included future National Football League (NFL) players Carl Brazley, Darryl Drake, Ray Farmer, Ricky Gwinn, Lamont Meacham, Eddie Preston, Phil Rich, Troy Snardon, Brad Todd, Tony Towns, and Pete Walters. Towns was selected to play in the Blue-Gray Football Classic and Coach Feix was named OVC Coach of the Year for the second time. The All-Conference Team included Brazley, John Hall, Reginald Hayden, Preston, and Towns.

Schedule

References

Western Kentucky
Western Kentucky Hilltoppers football seasons
Ohio Valley Conference football champion seasons
Western Kentucky Hilltoppers football